Atanas Apostolov (born 11 March 1989) is a Bulgarian football manager and former footballer, who currently is head coach of Rozova Dolina.

Playing career
Apostolov joined Beroe when he was eight years old and signed his first contract in 2006. He made his A PFG debut on 10 October 2007 in a 1–0 away defeat against CSKA Sofia. Apostolov would play in 18 more league matches during the season, scoring two goals. In June 2009 he wa transferred to  OFC Sliven 2000, but six months later returned to Beroe. In the end of the 2009–10 season he and his team won the Bulgarian Cup.

Managerial career
In July 2018, Apostolov was announced as the new manager of Rozova Dolina, staying in the club also as a player. He led the team to first major title winning the Cup of Bulgarian Amateur Football League. In June 2021 he was announced to join the CSKA 1948 technical crew. On 27 July 2021 he was announced as the new manager of CSKA 1948 II, after Miroslav Mindev was promoted as manager to the first team. On 14 September 2021 he left CSKA 1948 II by mutual consent.

Honours

Club
 Beroe
Bulgarian Cup: 2009-10
 Rozova Dolina
Cup of Bulgarian Amateur Football League: 2020–21

References

External links

1989 births
Living people
Sportspeople from Stara Zagora
Bulgarian footballers
Bulgarian football managers
First Professional Football League (Bulgaria) players
Second Professional Football League (Bulgaria) players
PFC Beroe Stara Zagora players
OFC Sliven 2000 players
FC Lyubimets players
Akademik Sofia players
FC Vereya players
Association football wingers